Dentalium gouldii, commonly called the Gould tuskshell, is a species of tusk shell, a marine scaphopod mollusc in the family Dentaliidae.

References

Scaphopods
Molluscs described in 1889